Lowry Lake is a  lake located on Vancouver Island north of Great Central Lake, west of Dickson Lake.

Nearby Lakes
Ash, Turnbull and McLaughlin Lakes - Ash, Turnbull and McLaughlin Lakes are located nearby and accessed via either Highway 4(west), Great Central Lake Road or the Ash River logging mainline.

References

Alberni Valley
Lakes of Vancouver Island
Lakes of British Columbia
Clayoquot Land District